Bernstorff Fjord is a fjord in King Frederick VI Coast, eastern Greenland. 

Administratively it is part of the Sermersooq municipality. The fjord was named after Danish statesman Andreas Peter Bernstorff. This fjord is almost always blocked by heavy ice.

History
One of the coastal islands, Igdluluarssuk (Sattiaatteq) at the entrance of the fjord on its southern side, had had the northernmost Inuit settlement of the southern group on the east coast in the recent past.

Arctic explorer Wilhelm August Graah of the Danish Navy explored this area in 1828–30, during an expedition in search of the legendary Eastern Norse Settlement.

Geography
{ "type": "ExternalData", "service": "geoshape", "ids": "Q3745812", "properties": { "fill": "#0050d0"}}

To the east the Bernstorff Fjord opens into the Irminger Sea (North Atlantic Ocean). It separates the Odinland Peninsula with its SE end, Cape Møsting to the north, from the Thorland Peninsula and Cape Moltke to the south of the fjord.

The Storebjørn, Bernstorff, Fimbul and Sleipner glaciers at the head of this fjord produce massive amounts of ice. The Ydun Glacier, Gerd Glacier and Gymer Glacier are smaller glaciers flowing from Odinland into the northern shore of Bernstorff Fjord, and the  Tjalfe Glacier and Røskva Glacier flow from Thorland into the southern shore. The constant glacier activity produces a powerful current streaming out of the fjord which, together with the numerous ice floes, makes navigation hazardous in the area between its mouth and Umivik Bay.

See also
List of fjords of Greenland

Bibliography
Spencer Apollonio, Lands That Hold One Spellbound: A Story of East Greenland, 2008

References

External links
Picture of Ensomheden in the middle of Bernstorff Fjord
Seabirds and seals in Southeast Greenland; Results from a survey in July 2014

Fjords of Greenland